This is a list of chess players who have represented more than one nation in FIDE-sanctioned tournaments. These players underwent a change in national federation affiliation but may not necessarily changed their citizenship in the process but may have to satisfy residency requirements. This excludes players which did not compete in any FIDE-sanctioned event for their previous federation.

To countries in the Americas

To countries in Asia

To countries in Europe

To countries in Oceania

See also
List of sportspeople who competed for more than one nation
FIDE flag player

References

Nationality transfers in chess
Chess